Yacht Rock may refer to:

Yacht Rock (web series), an American web series
Yacht rock, the musical term derived from the series